The CMLL International Gran Prix (2017) was a lucha libre, or professional wrestling, tournament produced and scripted by the Mexican professional wrestling promotion Consejo Mundial de Lucha Libre (CMLL; "World Wrestling Council" in Spanish) that took place on September 1, 2017 in Arena México, Mexico City, Mexico, CMLL's main venue. The 2017 International Gran Prix was the thirteenth time CMLL held an International Gran Prix tournament since 1994. All International Gran Prix tournaments have been a one-night tournament, always as part of CMLL's Friday night CMLL Super Viernes shows. The event was available as an internet pay per view (iPPV) both in and outside of Mexico.

The main event of the show was a sixteen-man torneo cibernetico elimination match, where "Team Mexico"  (Valiente, Rush, Volador Jr., Euforia, Dragon Lee, Diamante Azul, Mephisto and Último Guerrero) faced off against "Team International" (Michael Elgin, Marco Corleone, Johnny Idol, Juice Robinson, Sam Adonis, Satoshi Kojima, Matt Taven and Kenny King). As in previous years, the "international" side has consisted of a combination of non-Mexican wrestlers who already worked for CMLL and foreign wrestlers brought in specifically for the tournament.

Production

Background

In 1994, the Mexican professional wrestling promotion Consejo Mundial de Lucha Libre created the International Gran Prix tournament which took place on April 15 that saw Rayo de Jalisco Jr. defeat King Haku to win the tournament. the tournament became annual tournament but after the 1998 tournament, the tournament became inactive. in 2002, the tournament returned with new rules. (Mexico and International group vs another Mexican and International group and then Mexicans vs Japanese and finally Mexico vs International) the 2017 tournament will be 12'th in the series.

Feuds
During a press conference, CMLL announced "Team International" as Marco Corleone, Juice Robinson, Kenny King, Satoshi Kojima, Johnny Idol, Michael Elgin, Sam Adonis and Matt Taven while "Team Mexico" as Rush, Diamante Azul, Último Guerrero, Valiente, Dragon Lee, Euforia, Volador Jr. and Mephisto and other information including it would be a special Super Viernes show and saw  a Torneo Cibernetico during a Guadalajara show that featured Michael Elgin picking up the win for "Team Resto del Mundo" by pinning Volador Jr., which would be noted as a "preview of the Gran Prix" and with Marco Corleone  being noted as "Extranjero" (Foreigner), he started acting more like a rudo including (along with Robinson and Taven) attacking KeMonito during a match and Taven stealing Azul's mask along with other "Extranjeros" attacking the rest of Team Mexico.

On August 9, 2017, CMLL announced that Kenny King would replace King Haku because of immigration complications.

Results

References

2017 in professional wrestling
September 2017 events in Mexico
CMLL International Gran Prix
2017 in Mexico